Shir ("Lion") may refer to:

 Shir, Mazandaran, a village in Fereydunkenar County, Iran
 Shir, South Khorasan, a village in Sarbisheh County, Iran
 Shir, Syria, a village
 Shir (Neolithic site), a site in western Syria, near Hama

See also 
 Arslan, a Persian or Turkic word for 'lion'
 Asad, an Arabic term for 'lion'
 Bernard Shir-Cliff (1924-2017), American editor 
 Sher (disambiguation)
 Shir ha-shirim, also known as The Song of Songs, a biblical scroll
 Shira (disambiguation)
 Shira Haas, Israeli actress
 Shirabad (disambiguation)
 Shiri (disambiguation)
 Shiri Appleby, American actress of Israeli descent
 Shiri Maimon, Israeli singer